Herman "Rounder" Cunningham (birthdate unknown) was a Negro leagues shortstop and for several years before the founding of the first Negro Southern League in 1920, and in its first few seasons.

References

Montgomery Grey Sox players